Pictorium koperbergi is a species of sea snail, a marine gastropod mollusk in the family Cerithiidae.

Description

Distribution
The distribution of Pictorium koperbergi includes the Western Central Pacific.
 Philippines

References

 Strong E.E. & Bouchet P. (2013) Cryptic yet colorful: anatomy and relationships of a new genus of Cerithiidae (Caenogastropoda, Cerithioidea) from coral reef drop-offs. Invertebrate Biology 132(4): 326–351

External links

Cerithiidae
Gastropods described in 1907